Casey is a given name, originally derived from the Irish Gaelic cathasaigh, meaning "vigilant" or "watchful". It is also a nickname; in the case of girls, it can be used as a derivative nickname for the name Cassandra or for either sex, the initials K.C.. It is in use for girls or boys in both the United States, the United Kingdom and other English-speaking countries. It was the 326th most popular name for boys born in the United States in 2007 and the 458th most popular name for girls. It ranked among the top 200 names for both sexes in the 1990s. Variants include Caicey, Kaisey, Caci, Casi, Cacey, Cayce, Kacey, Kacee, KC, Kaci, Kasi, Kacy, Kacie, Kasie, Kasey, Kaycee, Kaysee, Kayci, Kaysi, Kaycey, Kaysey, Kaycie, Kaysie, and Keize.

People with the given name Casey 
Casey Abrams (born 1991), American Idol contestant and musical artist
Casey Affleck (born 1975), American actor, brother of actor/director Ben Affleck
Casey Anthony (born 1986), American woman accused of killing her two-year old daughter, Caylee
Casey Atwood (born 1980), American racecar driver
Casey Beathard, American country music songwriter
Casey Blake (born 1973), American baseball player
Casey Cagle (born 1966), American politician
Casey Calvert (born 1990), American pornographic film actress
Casey Candaele (born 1961), American baseball player
Casey Connor (born 1978),  American lacrosse player
Casey Cott (born 1992), American actor
Casey Crawford (born 1987), American professional basketball player
Casey Crawford (American football) (born 1977), American football player
Casey Daigle (born 1981), American baseball player
Casey Dailey (born 1975), American football player
Casey Deidrick (born 1987), American actor and singer
Casey Dellacqua (born 1985), Australian tennis player
Casey DeSantis (born 1980), former American television host, wife of 46th florida governor Ron DeSantis
Casey Desmond (born 1986), American singer-songwriter
Casey Donovan (actor) (1943–1987), American pornographic actor
Casey Donovan (singer) (born 1988), Australian singer
Casey Dunn (American football) (born 1994), American football player
Casey Ellison (born 1975), American actor
Casey Fossum (born 1978), American baseball player
Casey Gallagher (born 1996), English darts player
Casey Haines (born 1986), American ice hockey player
Casey Hampton (born 1977), American NFL football nose tackle
Casey Hudson, American game developer
Casey Jacobsen (born 1981), American basketball player
Casey Johnson (1979–2010), American actress, socialite and heiress to the Johnson and Johnson empire and fortune
Casey Jones (1864–1900), American railroad engineer
Casey Kasem (1932–2014), American radio personality
Case Keenum (born 1988), American football quarterback
Casey Kotchman (born 1983), American baseball player
Casey Kozlowski (born 1987), member of the Ohio House of Representatives
Casey Laulala (born 1982), New Zealand rugby union player
Casey Lawrence (born 1987), American baseball pitcher
Casey Loyd (born 1989), American soccer player
Casey Martin (born 1972), American golfer
Casey Matthews (born 1989), American football linebacker
Casey McGehee (born 1982), American baseball infielder
Casey McPherson (born 1978), American singer and songwriter for Flying Colors and Alpha Rev
Casey Mears (born 1978), American racecar driver
Casey Mitchell (basketball) (born 1988), basketball player for Elitzur Ashkelon of the Israeli Basketball Premier League
Casey Nicholaw (born 1962), American theatre director
Casey Neistat (born 1981), American filmmaker
Casey Owens (c. 1981–2014), United States Marine
Casey Patton (born 1974), Canadian boxer
Casey Powell (born 1976), American lacrosse player
Casey Prather (born 1991), American basketball player in the Israeli Basketball Premier League
Casey Rabach (born 1977), American football player
Casey Reinhardt (born 1986), American actress
Casey Roberts (1901–1949), American set decorator
Casey Royer (born 1958), American musician
Casey Sander (born 1956), American actor
Casey Shaw (born 1975), American basketball center
Casey Spooner (born 1970), American artist
Casey Stengel (1890–1975), American baseball player and manager
Casey Stoner (born 1985), Australian motorcyclist
Casey Thompson (born 1998), American football player
Casey Tibbs (1929–1990), American rodeo performer and actor
Casey Tiumalu (born 1961), American football player
Casey Toohill (born 1996), American football player
Casey Tucker (born 1995), American football player
Casey Viator (1951–2013), American bodybuilder
Casey Walker (born 1989), American football player
Casey Weldon (born 1969), former American football player
Casey Weldon, American post-pop surrealism artist
Casey Wescott, musician with the band Fleet Foxes
Casey Wilson (born 1980), American actress

Characters 
Casey Refrains, character in Harold Pinter's play Betrayal
Casey, in the 1888 poem Casey at the Bat
Casey, the puppet companion of Mr. Dressup
Casey Becker, in the film Scream (1996 film) played by Drew Barrymore
Casey Braxton, from the Australian soap opera Home and Away
Casey Carlyle, in the 2005 film Ice Princess played by Michelle Trachtenberg
Casey Cartwright, on the television series Greek
Casey Connor, in the 1998 film The Faculty played by Elijah Wood
Casey Cooke, a main character in the 2016 film Split played by Anya Taylor-Joy
Casey Gardner, from the television series Atypical
Casey Hughes, on the soap opera As the World Turns
Casey Jones, in the Teenage Mutant Ninja Turtles universe
Casey Junior, a locomotive in the 1941 film Dumbo
Casey Kelso, on the television series That '70s Show
Casey Matthis, a character in the 2013 American comedy film We're the Millers
Casey McCall, on the television series Sports Night
Casey McDonald, one of the main characters and Derek's stepsister on the television series Life with Derek
Casey Newton, in the 2015 film Tomorrowland played by Britt Robertson
Casey Novak, on the television series Law & Order: SVU
Casey Parker, from the television series Grey’s Anatomy
Casey Poe, Cameron Poe's daughter in the 1997 film Con Air played by Landry Allbright
Casey Rhodes, the Red Ranger in Power Rangers Jungle Fury
Casey Ryback, in the Under Siege films played by Steven Seagal
Casey Shraeger, a character in the television series The Unusuals
Casey Stoner, a character from MotoGP
Casey Swine, on the Australian television series Blinky Bill

See also
Casey (surname)

Notes

English feminine given names
English masculine given names
English unisex given names
English-language unisex given names
Irish feminine given names
Irish masculine given names
Irish unisex given names
Lists of people by nickname